Santos Michelena (1797–1848) was a Venezuelan politician. Born in Maracay, Aragua. He was the vice president of Venezuela from 1841 until 1845. He also served as Minister of Foreign Affairs of Venezuela three times, under three different presidents. He was the Minister of Finance from 1830 to 1833, from 1834 to 1835 and in 1837.

References

External links

 

1797 births
1848 deaths
People from Maracay
Vice presidents of Venezuela
Venezuelan Ministers of Foreign Affairs
Finance ministers of Venezuela
Deaths by stabbing in Venezuela
Venezuelan murder victims